Elly Schwab-Agallidis (born Elly Agallidis, ;  – ) was a Greek physicist/physical chemist and one of the first women in Greece to be awarded a PhD in the field. She was the wife of Georg-Maria Schwab, who met her in Munich as the supervisor of the experimental work for her doctoral thesis; the couple then worked together as researchers in the Kanellopoulos Institute after they emigrated in Greece. Her most famous work concerned the properties and reactivity of parahydrogen.

Biography 
Elly Agallidis was born in 1914 to a middle class family of Athens; she was the first child of Ioannis Agallidis and Maria-Edith Agallidis (née Zannou). She graduated with a degree in Physics from the University of Athens in 1934 and continued with postgraduate studies in the Physical Chemistry Laboratory of the University of Munich, then under the direction of Heinrich Otto Wieland. It was there that she met Georg-Maria Schwab, her future husband, who suggested that she examine parahydrogen and supervised her experimental work.

Schwab was banned from teaching in Nazi Germany due to his half-Jewish origin. With the increasing fear of prosecution, he decided in 1930 to emigrate to Elly's homeland, Greece. Agallidis and Schwab married in Athens the same year. Schwab-Agallidis was able to find work for both in the chemical laboratory of the Kanellopoulos Institute of Chemistry and Agriculture, where the couple collaborated on various topics of physico-chemical research for the next ten years (1939–1949). Among those topics Schwab-Agallidis continued her work on the properties of parahydrogen, for which she received her PhD by the Department of Physics of the University of Athens in 1939 and published multiple relevant papers in the following years. At the same period she also delivered lectures on Physical Chemistry at the University of Athens.

After a difficult period for the couple during the Axis occupation of Greece and the resumption of their research after the liberation of Greece, the two scientists eventually returned to West Germany when Schwab was offered the Professorship of Physical Chemistry at the University of Munich in 1951.

Elly Schwab-Agallidis died in Essen at the age of 92 in 2006.

References 

Greek chemists
Greek women chemists
20th-century Greek physicists
Greek women physicists
1914 births
2006 deaths
Physical chemists
Greek emigrants to Germany
Scientists from Athens